Bhartiya Senior Secondary School is located in Mohindergarh, near Mahendragarh, Haryana, India. It was established in 1998.

See also
Education in India
Literacy in India  
Amity International School, Gurgaon
List of institutions of higher education in Haryana

References

External links
CBSE website

High schools and secondary schools in Haryana
Educational institutions established in 1998
1998 establishments in Haryana
Mahendragarh district